Ab Jirak (also Romanized as Āb Jīrak; also known as Āb Chīrak) is a village in Lishtar Rural District, in the Central District of Gachsaran County, Kohgiluyeh and Boyer-Ahmad Province, Iran. At the 2006 census, its population was 287, in 63 families.

References 

Populated places in Gachsaran County